Andréa Vianna Beltrão (born 16 September 1963) is a Brazilian actress and playwright. She is most known for acting in comic roles, especially as Marilda in the TV series A Grande Família.

Selected filmography
 Ciranda de Pedra (1981)
 Elas por Elas (1982)
 Corpo a Corpo (1984)
 Armação Ilimitada (1985-1988)
 Rainha da Sucata (1990)
 Pedra sobre Pedra (1992)
 Mulheres de Areia (1993)
 Radical Chic (1993)
 A Viagem (1994)
 A Comédia da Vida Privada (1995-1997)
 Vira Lata (1996)
 Era uma Vez... (1998)
 Zorra Total (1999)
 Você Decide (1999)
 Brava Gente (2000)
 As Filhas da Mãe (2001)
 Os Normais (2001)
 A Grande Família (2002-2009)
 Sitcom.br (2004)
 Os Aspones (2004)
 Cazuza – O Tempo Não Pára (2004)
 Salve Geral (2009)
 Som & Fúria (2009)
 Tapas & Beijos (2011-2015)
 O Bem Amado (2011)
 Cidade Proibida (2017)
 Malhação: Vidas Brasileiras (2018)
 Hebe: A Estrela do Brasil (2019)
 Um Lugar ao Sol (2021)

References

External links
 

Living people
1963 births
Brazilian television actresses
Brazilian people of Portuguese descent